The March or Marquisate of Turin was a territory of medieval Italy from the mid-10th century, when it was established as the Arduinic March. It comprised several counties in Piedmont, including the counties of Turin, Auriate, Albenga and, probably, Ventimiglia. The confines of the march thus stretched across the Po Valley from the Western Alps in the north, to the Ligurian Sea.

Because of the later importance of the city and valley of Susa to the House of Savoy, whose members styled themselves as "marquises of Susa", the march is sometimes referred to as the March or Marquisate of Susa. Yet in the tenth and early eleventh centuries, the city and valley of Susa were not the most important part of the county, let alone the march, of Turin. Successive members of the Arduinici dynasty were documented far more frequently in their capital, the city of Turin, than anywhere else, and until the late 1020s, Susa was controlled by a cadet branch of the dynasty, rather than by the marquises themselves.

History
The march was formed by a reorganisation of the territory of the kingdom of Italy into three marches, named after their three ruling dynasties:
the Marca Arduinica, or mark of the Arduinici (created in 964)
the Marca Aleramica, or mark of the Aleramici (created in 967)
the Marca Obertenga or mark of the Obertenghi (created in 961)

Arduin Glaber was invested as count of Turin in 941 by Hugh of Italy. Arduin had captured Turin and the Susa Valley from the Saracens. In 964, Arduin was appointed margrave of Turin by Emperor Otto I. The march continued to be ruled by members of the Arduinici thereafter. Arduin Glaber's son Manfred I succeeded him and his son, Ulric Manfred II, succeeded him. Ulric had no son, so he left the march to his daughter Adelaide. Although Adelaide ruled in her own right, de jure control passed to her husband Otto, count of Aosta. Their descendants would later comprise the House of Savoy. Gundulph, the father of St Anselm, may have represented a collateral branch of Manfred's dynasty.

After Adelaide’s death in 1091, the march of Turin broke up. Comital authority in the city of Turin was invested in the bishop of Turin (1092) and the city itself became a commune (1091). 
In 1092, the emperor Henry IV appointed his son Conrad as margrave of Turin (Conrad was Adelaide’s grandson via her daughter Bertha of Savoy). Although Conrad attempted to gain control of the march, his power was never effectual and the title was largely nominal. Instead, the northern part of the march of Turin was absorbed into Savoy, which was ruled by another of Adelaide’s grandsons, Humbert II (many centuries later, Turin became the capital of this dynasty.) To the south, lands which had composed the march of Turin were annexed by Adelaide's nephew, Boniface del Vasto.

List of Margraves of Turin

Arduinici
 962–977 Arduin Glaber
 977–1000 Manfred I
1000–1034 Ulric Manfred II
1034–1091 Adelaide, de facto ruler, with her husbands, sons and grandson-in-law.

House of Babenberg
1037–1038 Herman IV, Duke of Swabia (Adelaide's first husband)

Aleramici
1041–1045 Henry, Margrave of Montferrat (Adelaide's second husband)

House of Savoy
1046–1060 Otto, Count of Savoy (Adelaide's third husband)
1060–1078 Peter I, Count of Savoy (Adelaide's son)
1078–1080 Amadeus II, Count of Savoy (Adelaide's son)

House of Montbéliard
1080–1091 Frederick of Montbéliard (Adelaide's grandson-in-law)

The title Count of Turin was later used by Prince Vittorio Emanuele of Savoy, a member of the House of Savoy which ruled Italy from 1861 and 1946.

Notes

References

Citations

Bibliography
 . 
 . 
 .
 . 
 
 . 
 . 
 .

External links
 Marca Arduinica 

Marches of the Holy Roman Empire
Marquisates of Italy
Kingdom of Italy (Holy Roman Empire)
House of Savoy
States and territories established in the 940s
941 establishments